Asma may refer to:

 Asma (given name), list of people with the given name
 Asma, Bozdoğan, a village in the district of Bozdoğan, Aydın Province, Turkey
 Asma, Socotra, a village and ridge on the island of Socotra, Yemen
 Tropical Storm Asma (2008), in the South-West Indian Ocean

See also
 Aasmah Mir
 ASMA (disambiguation)
 Asthma, inflammatory disease of the airways characterized by symptoms such as wheezing and shortness of breath